Carl Julius Norstrøm (6 January 1936 – 15 June 2012) was a Norwegian economist who served as rector of the Norwegian School of Economics (NHH) from 1995–1998. He was a professor at NHH and a graduate of the same institution.

References

1936 births
2012 deaths
Norwegian economists
Norwegian School of Economics alumni
Academic staff of the Norwegian School of Economics
Rectors of the Norwegian School of Economics